Laclede County is a county located in the U.S. state of Missouri. As of the 2010 census, the population was 35,571. Its county seat is Lebanon. The county was organized February 24, 1849, and was named after Pierre Laclède, founder of St. Louis.

Laclede County comprises the Lebanon, MO Micropolitan Statistical Area.

Geography

Adjacent counties
Camden County (north)
Pulaski County (northeast)
Texas County (southeast)
Wright County (south)
Webster County (southwest)
Dallas County (west)

Major highways
 Interstate 44
 U.S. Route 66 (1926-1979)
 Route 5
 Route 7
 Route 17
 Route 32
 Route 64
 Route 64A

National protected area
Mark Twain National Forest (part)

Demographics

As of the census of 2000, there were 32,513 people, 12,760 households, and 9,187 families residing in the county. The population density was 42 people per square mile (16/km2). There were 14,320 housing units at an average density of 19 per square mile (7/km2). The racial makeup of the county was 97.04% White, 0.42% Black or African American, 0.49% Native American, 0.29% Asian, 0.05% Pacific Islander, 0.34% from other races, and 1.37% from two or more races. Approximately 1.23% of the population were Hispanic or Latino of any race.

There were 12,760 households, out of which 33.90% had children under the age of 18 living with them, 58.90% were married couples living together, 9.40% had a female householder with no husband present, and 28.00% were non-families. 24.00% of all households were made up of individuals, and 11.00% had someone living alone who was 65 years of age or older. The average household size was 2.52 and the average family size was 2.97.

In the county, the population was spread out, with 26.70% under the age of 18, 8.40% from 18 to 24, 27.80% from 25 to 44, 22.90% from 45 to 64, and 14.10% who were 65 years of age or older. The median age was 37 years. For every 100 females there were 96.40 males. For every 100 females age 18 and over, there were 92.90 males.

The median income for a household in the county was $29,562, and the median income for a family was $35,962. Males had a median income of $27,011 versus $18,283 for females. The per capita income for the county was $15,572. About 11.50% of families and 14.30% of the population were below the poverty line, including 16.50% of those under age 18 and 15.90% of those age 65 or over.

2020 Census

Education

Public schools
Laclede County R-I School District – Conway
Ezard Elementary School (PK-06) 
Conway Junior High School (07-08)
Conway High School (09-12)
Gasconade C-4 School District – Falcon
Gasconade Elementary School (PK-08)
Lebanon R-III School District – Lebanon
Joe D. Esther Elementary School (PK-01) 
Maplecrest Elementary School (02-03) 
Boswell Elementary School (04-05) 
Lebanon Middle School (06-08)
Lebanon High School (09-12)
Joel E. Barber C-5 School District - Lebanon
Joel E. Barber Elementary School (PK-08)
Stoutland R-II School District – Stoutland
Stoutland Elementary School (PK-06) 
Stoutland High School (07-12)

Post Secondary Schools

Ozarks Technical Community College 

Drury University 

Lebanon College of Cosmetology 

Missouri State University Outreach-Lebanon

Public libraries
Lebanon-Laclede County Library

Politics

Local
The Republican Party completely controls politics at the local level in Laclede County. Republicans hold all of the elected positions in the county.

State

Laclede County is split between two of Missouri's legislative districts that elect members of the Missouri House of Representatives, both of which are represented by Republicans.

District 123 — Diane Franklin (R-Camdenton). Consists of the northern and eastern parts of the county, including Falcon and part of Lebanon.

District 129 — Sandy Crawford (R-Buffalo). Consists of the southwestern part of the county, including Conway, Evergreen, Phillipsburg, and most of Lebanon. 

All of Laclede County is a part of Missouri's 28th District in the Missouri Senate. The seat is currently vacant. The previous incumbent, Mike Parson, was elected lieutenant governor in 2016.

Federal

All of Laclede County is included in Missouri's 4th Congressional District and is currently represented by Vicky Hartzler (R-Harrisonville) in the U.S. House of Representatives.

Political culture

Missouri presidential preference primary (2008)

Former Governor Mike Huckabee (R-Arkansas) received more votes, a total of 2,791, than any candidate from either party in Laclede County during the 2008 presidential primary.

Communities

Cities
Conway
Lebanon (county seat)
Richland (mostly in Pulaski County and a small part in Camden County)

Villages
Evergreen
Phillipsburg
Stoutland (mostly in Camden County)

Townships
Auglaize
Eldridge
Franklin
Gasconade
Lebanon
Osage
Phillipsburg
Spring Hollow
Washington

Census-designated place
Bennett Springs

Other unincorporated places

 Abo
 Agnes
 Bidwell
 Brownfield
 Brush Creek
 Caffeyville
 Carrol Junction
 Case
 Competition
 Delmar
 Dove
 Drew
 Drynob
 Eldridge
 Falcon
 Grace
 Hazelgreen
 Ira
 Lynchburg
 Lyons
 Morgan
 Nebo
 Oakland
 Origanna
 Orla
 Pease
 Prosperine
 Radar
 Russ
 Saint Annie
 Sleeper
 Southard
 Winnipeg

See also
 List of counties in Missouri
National Register of Historic Places listings in Laclede County, Missouri

References

Further reading
 History of Laclede, Camden, Dallas, Webster, Wright, Texas, Pulaski, Phelps, and Dent counties, Missouri (1889) full text

External links
 Laclede County official website
 Digitized 1930 Plat Book of Laclede County  from University of Missouri Division of Special Collections, Archives, and Rare Books

 
1849 establishments in Missouri
Populated places established in 1849